Creedence Gold is a compilation album of the band Creedence Clearwater Revival released in 1972. More Creedence Gold formed the second part, released in 1973.

The original vinyl release featured pictures of the band under the colored profile flaps on the cover. Overseas releases switched the cover art, with the band photo on the front, and the colored silhouettes on the back.

A quadraphonic version of this album was released on both vinyl and 8-track cartridge formats, and is considered one of the rarest quadraphonic releases.

Track listing

Personnel
Doug Clifford – drums
Stu Cook – bass
John Fogerty – lead guitar, harmonica, lead vocals
Tom Fogerty – rhythm guitar, backing vocals, co-lead vocals on "Suzie Q"

References 

Creedence Clearwater Revival compilation albums
1972 compilation albums
Fantasy Records compilation albums
Albums produced by John Fogerty
Albums produced by Saul Zaentz